Hadrodontina is an extinct genus of conodonts in the family Ellisoniidae.

References 

 The Triassic System: New Developments in Stratigraphy and Paleontology. Lawrence H. Tanner, Justin A. Spielmann and Spencer G. Lucas

External links 

 
 Hadrodontina at fossilworks.org (retrieved 22 April 2016)
 Hadrodontina at gbif.org (retrieved 22 April 2016)

Prioniodinida genera